Cameron is a town in Steuben County, New York, United States. The population is 898 as of 2020. The town is named after Dugald Cameron, an early settler and land agent of the Pulteney Estate.

The Town of Cameron is centrally located in the county, west of the City of Corning.

History 

Around 1800, the first settler arrived near the present community of Cameron. The town was formed from the Town of Addison in 1822. Parts of Cameron were lost on the founding of the towns of Thurston (1844) and Rathbone (1856).

The New York and Erie Railroad line through Cameron opened in September 1850. The line, recently owned by the Norfolk Southern Railway, with trains operated by NS and Canadian Pacific (the latter under haulage arrangements), was destroyed by Hurricane Agnes in 1972 and had to be rebuilt afterwards.

The population of Cameron in 1905 was 1,217.

Geography

The Canisteo River flows through the town. Route 119 parallels the river.

Demographics

At the 2020 census, there were 899 people and 386 households. The population density was 19.2 per square mile (7.43/km2). There were 434 housing units at an average density of 9.27 per square mile (3.59/km2). The racial makeup of the town was 92.7% White, 0.44% African American, 1.56% Hispanic or Latino, and 1.45% from other unspecified races. 5.23% of the population belongs to more than one race. 

There were 365 occupied households, of which 51.5% were married-couple families, 6.8% had a female householder with no husband present, 7.1% had a male householder with no wife present and, and 65.5% were non-families. The average household and family size was 2.84. At the time of the census, 57.9% of the population was married, 4.5% widowed, 12.6% divorced, and 2.4% separated. 22.6% were never married.

26.0% of the population were under the age of 18, with 7.6% under the age of 5. 74.0% were over 18, and 15% were 65 years of age or older. The median age was 38.1 years. 

The median household income was $50,833. Among families, the median family income was $61,667 while among nonfamily households, it was $37,500. The per capita income was $15,455. About 23.6% of the population were below the poverty line, including 38.7% of those under age 18, 20.9% of those between the age of 18 and 64, and 9.1% of those age 65 or over.

Communities and locations in the Town of Cameron 
Bonny Hill – A location in the northeast part of the town and northeast of North Cameron.
Boyds Corner – A location south of South Cameron on Jackson Hill Road.
Cameron – The hamlet of Cameron by the junction of County Roads 10 and 119 by the Canisteo River.
Cameron Mills – A hamlet by the town line in the southeast part of the town.
North Cameron – A hamlet near the north town line on County Road 10A.
South Cameron – A hamlet southwest of Cameron hamlet, located on Jackson Hill Road.
West Cameron – A hamlet northwest of Cameron hamlet on Route 119.

Notable person
William W. Averell, (1832–1900), born in Cameron, United States Army officer and patenter of asphalt pavement
[DR. Robert L. Masti,  (1993) Born in Cameron, NY,  Only person in the town of Cameron to receive a Doctorate in Aerospace engineering from Virginia Tech.

References

External links 
 Cameron information
 Cameron history/links

Populated places established in 1800
Towns in Steuben County, New York
1800 establishments in New York (state)